Air Marshal Malik Nur Khan Awan  (22 February 1923 – 15 December 2011) commonly known as Nur Khan, was a three-star air officer, politician, sports administrator, and the Commander-in-Chief of the Pakistan Air Force, serving under President Ayub Khan from 1965 until 1969.

Born into Punjabi Awan tribe in Attock, he gained commissioned in the Royal Indian Air Force after graduating from Rashtriya Indian Military College in Dehra Dun in 1941. He participated in World War II on the side of the United Kingdom and opted for Pakistan as an aftermath of the partition of British India in 1947. He gained nationwide famed and public notability when he commanded and led Pakistan Air Force in the second war with India in 1965 as well as noted for his aerial skills when he participated on Six-Day War on behalf of Arab countries fighting against Israel. After retiring in 1969, he started his career in national politics and served as Governor of West Pakistan under President Yahya Khan as well as serving cabinet minister in Yahya administration from 1969 till 1970 when resigning over mutual disagreements.

During his career in the Air Force and the politics, he took charge of country's sportsmanship when he served as president/chairman of cricket, hockey, and squash where he introduced sport tactics and ideas that helped sporting performances and gained attention at the international venues. In addition, he also lobbied and pushed for the establishment of the Asian Cricket Council. Nur Khan, however, is regarded for his sharp intelligence and outstanding management skills that largely benefited the Pakistan's military and the organizations that he presided over.

Biography

Background, early life and World War II
Malik Nur Khan was born in the Tamman town located in the vicinity of Talagang Tehsil, Chakwal District in Punjab Province, British India on 22 February 1923. He belonged to an Awan family which had a notable military tradition. The family carried the title of "Malik" (lit. Ruler), a title which is mostly used by Awan families.

His father, Subedar-Major and honorary army captain Malik Mihr Khan,  had been in the British Indian Army and had served with the 15th Lancers, later 20th Lancers. He had been directly commissioned a Viceroy's Commissioned Officer in the rank of Jemedar 1 April 1911 into the 15th Lancers. He served in France and Belgium with the 15th Lancers from 23 September 1914 to January 1916 (during which time he was awarded the Indian Order of Merit, 2nd class) when the regiment was transferred to Mesopotamia. It later served in Persia on the East Persia Cordon, where he was promoted Ressidar and awarded the Indian Distinguished Service Medal. He was promoted Risaldar 3 September 1918 and remained in the army when on the 21 September 1920 the 14th Murray's Jat Lancers and the 15th Lancers amalgamated to form the 20th Lancers. He was promoted Risaldar-Major of the 20th Lancers on 27 May 1927, an appointment he was to hold until 1 May 1928 when he was appointed ADC to the General Officer Commanding, Eastern Command in India. He held this appointment until he retired on the 28 January 1936. He was admitted to the Order of British India 4 June 1935. He had been appointed Honorary Lieutenant 1 August 1931 and the Honorary Captain 1 August 1935.

His family roots traces back to the family of Nawab of Kalabagh Amir Mohammad Khan.

Completing his education from the famed Aitchison College, he was accepted to join the Rashtriya Indian Military College (RIMC) at Dehra Dun where he secured his graduation. He perform exceptionally well in RIMC where his British principal once noted as:

An excellent military family from a very military center. The boy has been well educated and is more advanced than many Awans of his age. He is physically fit and should make an officer anyhow, he is the right type.

Upon graduation, the family paid for his flying lesson to learn to fly the de Havilland Tiger Moth and got qualified as a pilot from the Northern India Flying Club Based at Lahore. In 1940, he was in the Royal Indian Air Force reserve and trained as an air crew from the United Kingdom. Nur Khan never attended the university nor he received university education instead of gaining commissioned as a Pilot officer in the No. 1 Squadron of the RIAF on 6 January 1941. In the United Kingdom, his additional training took place as a gunnery and bomber pilot with the RAF. Upon returning in 1942–43, he was sent to participate in the Burma campaign with the RIAF on the side of the United Kingdom, and served against the Imperial Japan in 1945.

In 1946, Nur Khan was made commanding officer of the No. 4 Squadron of the RIAF which he commanded until 1947. After the partition of British India which resulted in the establishment of Pakistan, Nur Khan opted for Pakistan and joined the newly formed Pakistan Air Force (PAF) where he was the base commander of the PAF Base Lahore.

Commander-in-Chief and between wars

In 1948, he was elevated as base commander of the PAF Base Chaklala but later posted as air attaché at the High Commission of Pakistan in the United Kingdom.  However, this position was short-lived when he was asked to return to Pakistan to be posted as commandant of Pakistan Air Force Academy (then PAF college)
in Risalpur, Punjab, also the same year.

His career in the Air Force progressed well as he was posted at the AHQ in Rawalpindi as the Director of Organizations, which he remained till 1951. He served as a F-86 Sabre program director where he oversaw the induction of the jet fighter as he played an influential role in the opposition against acquiring the F-84 Thunderjet. From 1955 to 1956, he was promoted as Group Captain and served base commander of the PAF Base Peshawar, followed by commanding the PAF Base Mauripur  and PAF Base Chaklala until 1957. Before posting at the AHQ in Rawalpindi as the Deputy Commander-in-Chief (Air Operations) in 1957, his last field assignment included his role AOC of No. 1 Group stationed in PAF Base Peshawar as an Air Commodore.

From 1958 to 1965, he served on the deputation as chairman of civilian organizations and his appointment to three-star appointment was approved by President Ayub Khan in 1965.  Air Marshal Asghar Khan resigned from the command of the Air Force as its chief when he cemented conflict of interests issues with President Ayub Khan. Air Vice Marshal Nur Khan was a populist military figure in the country due to his involvement in sports management and managing-director of civilian Pakistan International Airlines, and his name was included in the nomination papers for the command of the Air Force. On contrary, Nur Khan was never achieved to the four-star rank of Air Chief Marshal but appointed to serve as an air force commander under President President Ayub. In 1965, Nur Khan was appointed as Commander in Chief and promoted as Air Marshal.

During 1964–65, the Air Staff had been fighting with the Cabinet over the rearmament and contingency plans with the Ministry of Defence (MoD) and Ministry of Foreign Affairs (MoFA) as the Air Staff wanted coordinated efforts if there was a retaliation. The outgoing Air Marshal Asghar Khan handed over the ceremonial baton to Air Marshal Nur Khan and did not brief him about the impending operations in Indian administered Kashmir since the latter was not aware of it himself. However, there were suspicions regarding the secret operations undertaken by the army in the Air AHQ due to subsequent skirmishes in the eastern border. Therefore, Nur Khan called then-Army Commander in Chief General Musa Khan who admitted that "something was afoot." However, General Musa Khan assured Air Marshal Nur Khan of Indian not retaliating despite Nur Khan's strong reaction. Very few details of plan were emerged to both Nur Khan and Navy Commander in Chief Vice Admiral Afzal Rahman Khan and briefly wrote: "Rumours about an impending operation were rife but the army had not shared the plans with other forces."
During the war with India in 1965, Nur Khan became a national fame and hero when he maintained an aerial supremacy against Indian IAF despite its shortcomings. He led the bombing missions during the war using the C-130 Hercules for that purpose in support to the army advances. His actions of valor and efforts won him the praise in all over the country after the war; he was credited with turning the tide of the war in his country's favor that gained air superiority in the first 24 hours.

After the war, he was publicly honored and was famed figure in the country. In 1967, Nur Khan volunteered to serve in the allegiance of Arab countries' Air Forces against Israel during the Six-Day War. He served in many aerial missions and witnessed the dogfight with Israeli IAF whose pilots noted his aerial skills during the conflict. In fact, the Israeli IAF's fighter pilot, Major-General Ezer Weizman, the former Israeli President (1993–2000) and Defence Minister (1977–80), wrote in his autobiography that: "He was a formidable fellow and I was glad that he was Pakistani and not an Egyptian".

After the Six-Day conflict, Nur Khan returned to Pakistan to complete his tenure as Commander-in-Chief of Pakistan Air Force under President Ayub Khan and retired in 1969.

Civilian and sports management 

Nur Khan was gifted with administration skills. After the halcyon days of management at Pakistan International Airlines (PIA), he made a show of his talents in sports administration. Nur Khan, who at one time headed national sports bodies of hockey, cricket, and squash, enabled Pakistan to reach the top in all these games.

Pakistan International Airlines 
He was also known to turn around Pakistan International Airlines into a profitable and recognised entity In 1960, PIA's very first jetliner (a Boeing 707-321 leased from Pan Am) took a gentle turn under the command of Malik Nur Khan. Nur Khan was PIA's chairman from 1959 to 1965. His success in establishing PIA on a firm and profitable financial basis in six years is now a fact of airline history. Under his charismatic and inspirational leadership, PIA became one of the leading and respected airlines of the world. During his tenure, PIA became the third Asian airline to operate jet aircraft after India and Japan. The airline inducted modern Boeing 720 B jet in its fleet. PIA started flying to China and flights to Europe via Moscow were also launched during this period. In 1973, Nur Khan was specially requested by the government of Pakistan to resume control of PIA. During his second term as airline's head, PIA became operator of wide-body DC-10s and Boeing 747s. Popular Green & Gold aircraft livery was introduced, plus many more achievements were made by the airline under Nur Khan's leadership. He kept PIA out of Pakistan's turbulent political arena and returned it to a sound commercial basis. Nur Khan was a dynamic leader and believed in innovation and new ideas. He served as minister of Communications, Health, Labour and Science and Technology in Yahya Khan's cabinet.

On 20 January 1978, a PIA plane (while at Karachi) carrying 22 passengers was hijacked by a gunman and asked to be flown to India. The then chairman of PIA, Air Marshal (Retd) Nur Khan boarded the plane to negotiate with the hijacker. He was hit by a bullet while trying to disarm the hijacker but still managed to overpower him.

Hockey 
Nur Khan was handed the reins of Pakistan Hockey Federation as its president in 1976 and was President of the Pakistan Hockey Federation during 1967 – 1969, and 1976 – 1984. During his presidency, The Pakistan Hockey Federation won 2 Olympic Gold Medals (1968 Mexico & 1984 Los Angeles), 2 Hockey World Cups (1978 & 1982) and 2 Hockey Champions Trophy (1978 & 1980). Being a sports enthusiast, he not only ably facilitated the game at home for eight years. but also played an iconic role in international hockey arena. Conception of Champions Trophy, an annual hockey tournament, was his brain child that was realised in 1978 by his endeavours.

On his personal initiative, the FIH introduced the World Cup Tournament and the Champions Trophy Tournament, which are now rated amongst the major international tournaments, alongside the Olympics.

Being President Pakistan Hockey Federation, he donated World Cup Trophy and Champions Trophy to the International Hockey Federation. During his tenure Pakistan hockey team performed a grand-slam. The World Cup and Champions Trophy are the toughest events in Hockey.

He made valuable and tremendous contributions in Hockey in Pakistan. During his first tenure (1967–1969) that Pakistan hockey team won the Mexico Olympics and in second tenure (1976–1986) Pakistani team won Los Angeles Olympics.

Cricket 
In 1980, he was also brought in as President of Board of Control for Cricket in Pakistan (BCCP; currently known as Pakistan Cricket Board) to manage the disarrayed cricket affairs. He served as president from 1980 to 1984. In this capacity, he helped win the hosting rights for the 1987 Cricket World Cup with India. He was also part of the organising committee of the 1987 World Cup and was credited with bringing some of the World Cup matches to Pakistan.

Omar Noman, in his history of cricket in Pakistan, said: "Nur Khan was an exceptional administrator. He did not know much about cricket, but his efficiency and vision had a positive effect on the development of hockey, squash, and cricket."

Squash 
From 1951 to 1963, Pakistanis achieved remarkable success in Squash winning the most coveted title, the British Open, all those thirteen years. Thereafter, it was a barren period. Any Pakistani failed to land the title over the next decade except one Aftab Javaid who managed to reach the final. Nur Khan took over the charge of Pakistan International Airlines for the second time in 1973. He immediately took revolutionary steps. He initiated the PIA Colts scheme. Young promising boys were spotted and given a monthly stipend. They were coached and sent to participate in international tournaments with PIA bearing the travel expenses. Whosoever performed well on the international circuit was given permanent employment in PIA. The incentives didn't end there. If any of the players achieved some major success in prime events, he was rewarded with a departmental promotion. All this led to a surfeit of world class Pakistani players in the 70s: Qamar Zaman, Gogi Allauddin, Hiddy Jahan, Mo Khan Junior and others. There used to be six to seven Pakistanis among the top 10 in the world rankings.

In 1975, on Nur Khan's request, legendary Azam Khan, four-time winner of British Open (1959–62), who was running a squash club in England, prepared Qamar Zaman and Mohibullah Junior for the British Open. Qamar Zaman brought back the title to Pakistan after 12 years. He gave the Squash World Jahangir Khan, a pure PIA colts product who became the greatest squash player of all time. Pakistan Open initiated in 1980 became a prestigious tournament and the country also hosted World Open.

Politics and governorship 

In 1969, Nur Khan retired from his military service and his prestige led him to secure an appointment in Cabinet led by President Yahya Khan; but it was short-lived due to his demands for reforms. His tenure was renewed and his retirement was overturned by President Yahya who appointed him as Deputy CMLA under his administration.

In Yahya administration, he was inducted as cabinet minister of communications, health, labour, and science in August 1969.

Nur Khan, however, was appointed as Governor of West Pakistan on 1 September 1969 who made radical reforms in country's political and educational structure.

He supported the devolution of controversial One Unit program and oversaw its termination in 1970. He also announced new labour and educational policy to limit the role of politics in the universities. Nur Khan was later unexpectedly replaced with Lieutenant-General on 1 July 1970 after witnessing the termination of One Unit program and tendering resignation from his renewed term in 1970 over mutual disagreement with President Yahya.

In 1985, he decided to enter in national politics as a nonpartisan after successfully participating in the general elections to be elected as a member of National Assembly. In 1987, he joined the Pakistan Peoples Party (PPP) and contested for the Constituency NA-44 on a PPP's platform in the general elections held in 1988. He conceded his defeat and eventually retired from the politics in 1988.

Legacy and Commemoration 
In commemoration of his services rendered to Pakistan Air Force, PAF Base Chaklala was renamed as PAF Base Nur Khan in 2012.  Considered the hero of the 1965 air war - the man who led the Pakistan air force achieve parity over the three times larger Indian air force on the very first day of the 1965 war - a man widely respected not only for his integrity but also for his sharp intelligence and outstanding management abilities.

Awards and decorations

Foreign decorations

References

External links
 Thumbnail sketch Blog by Najam Khan at PAF Wallpapers
 Nur Khan in front of a T-37 (A picture at www.Flickr.com)
 Nur Khan in an F-86 cockpit (A picture at www.Flickr.com)
 Nur Khan in an F-104 cockpit (A picture at www.Flickr.com)
 Obituary, ESPNcricinfo
 Obituary , Siasat.pk website (www.siasat.pk)
 Obituary, NewsPakistan.Pk (islamabad.newspakistan.pk)
 Air Marshal Nur Khan | Ghazi of 1965 War

1923 births
2011 deaths
Punjabi people
People from Chakwal District
Rashtriya Indian Military College alumni
Indian people of World War II
Pakistani test pilots
Pakistani flying aces
Pakistan Air Force air marshals
Chiefs of Air Staff, Pakistan
Military personnel of the Indo-Pakistani War of 1965
Six-Day War pilots
Governors of West Pakistan
Pakistani autobiographers
Pakistani memoirists
Pakistani sports executives and administrators
Pakistan Hockey Federation presidents
Pakistan Cricket Board Presidents and Chairmen
Pakistan People's Party politicians
Pakistan International Airlines people
Recipients of Hilal-i-Jur'at
Air marshals of the Indo-Pakistani War of 1965
Pakistani air attachés
Hashemite people
Alids
Awan
Alvis